Australiana includes the items, people, places, flora, fauna and events of Australian origins. Anything pertaining to Australian culture, society, geography and ecology can fall under the term Australiana, especially if it is endemic to Australia. Australiana often borrows from Australian Aboriginal culture, or the stereotypical Australian culture of the early 1900s.

Objects can be Australiana in their own right, such as boomerangs, Akubra hats, and didgeridoos, or can be common objects with Australian cultural images displayed on them.  Such items might include two-man saws, snow globes or tea towels with Australian scenery or icons imprinted on them in the national colours of Australia (green and gold).

Australiana can also refer to art with an Australian style or subject.  Paintings, ceramics, crafts and coins that depict Australian imagery would fall under this category.
Australiana has also been called a style of kitsch art.

Topics 
People are sometimes depicted in the artwork, such as Australian explorers, drovers, bushranger, swagmen, Aboriginal Australians, diggers, stockmen, and the like.

Being on the beach in summer is also generally made out to be part of Australiana, as well as Surf Life Savers, as Australia is a coastal culture, because of the nature of inland Australia (dry, harsh desert).

Some commercial brands have become part of Australiana due to their perceived "Australianness".  Advertisements and posters depicting these brands often become part of Australiana as well.  The following themes are examples of Australiana:

Aboriginal culture 
 boomerang
 didgeridoo
 bush tucker

Animals 
These images are often well-known Australian animals and birds, such as
 Australian feral camel
 budgerigar
 cassowary
 saltwater crocodile
 dingo
 echidna
 emu
 frill-necked lizard
 kangaroo 
 koala
 kookaburra
 numbat 
 platypus
 quokka
 rainbow lorikeet 
 tasmanian devil
 wombat
 wallaby

Businesses 
 Bunnings Warehouse
 Coles
 Holden
 Kirks 
 Milk bar 
 Hungry Jack's
 Oporto
 Qantas
 Woolworths
 Myer

Clothing 
 Akubra hats
 Budgie smugglers
 Driza-Bone coats
 R. M. Williams boots
 Speedos swim briefs
 ugg boots

Food 
 Anzac biscuits 
 Arnott's Biscuits
 Chiko Roll
 Damper
 Fairy bread
 Four'N Twenty Pies
 Lamingtons
 Meat pie 
 Milo (beverage)
 Pavlova (dessert)
 Peters Ice Cream
 Rosella soup
 Sausage sizzle 
 Tim Tam
 Weet-Bix
 Victoria Bitter
 Vegemite
 XXXX beer

Music 
 Advance Australia Fair
 I Am Australian
 Pub rock (Australia)
 Waltzing Matilda
 I Still Call Australia Home
 Down Under
 Sounds of Then (This Is Australia)

People 
 Paul Hogan
 Steve Irwin
 Hugh Jackman
 Ned Kelly
 Jessica Mauboy
 Kylie Minogue

Places 
 Daintree Rainforest
 Great Barrier Reef
 Sydney Harbour Bridge
 Sydney Opera House 
 Uluru

Products 
 Aerogard 
 Esky 
 Hills Hoist
 Mortein
 Opals
 Victa lawn mowers

Sport 
 Australian rules football
 Cricket
 Rugby league
 Rugby union

See also 
 Culture of Australia
 William Dixson — a collector of early Australiana
 David Scott Mitchell — a collector of early Australiana
 Canadiana — a similar concept in Canada
 Americana — a similar concept in the United States
 Kiwiana — a similar concept in New Zealand
 Africana — a similar concept in South Africa
 Floridiana — a similar concept in Florida
 Hawaiiana — a similar concept in Hawaii
 Yugo-nostalgia — a similar concept in the former Yugoslav states
 Soviet nostalgia — a similar concept in the former Soviet Union
 Ostalgie — a similar concept in East Germany
 PRL nostalgia — a similar concept in Poland
 Communist nostalgia — a similar concept in former or currently communist countries
 Rhodesiana — a similar concept in Zimbabwe relating to items made in its colonial (Rhodesia) era

References

External links 

 The Australiana Society publishes a quarterly magazine, Australiana, which features research on Australian art, decorative art, artifacts and history.

Australian culture
Memorabilia